Stephen A. Sharp (born June 10, 1947) is an American attorney who served as a Commissioner of the Federal Communications Commission from 1982 to 1983.

In 1992, he was convicted of sexually assaulting a minor and sentenced to 10 years in prison.

References

1947 births
Living people
Members of the Federal Communications Commission
Ohio Republicans
Reagan administration personnel